Agafopus is a Russian Christian male first name. The name is derived from the Greek words agathos—meaning good—and pous/podos—meaning leg.

See also
Agafopod

References

Notes

Sources
А. В. Суперанская (A. V. Superanskaya). "Словарь русских имён" (Dictionary of Russian Names). Издательство Эксмо. Москва, 2005. 

